Rodney Wright (born 29 December 1960) is a former Australian rules footballer who played with North Melbourne and Melbourne in the Victorian Football League (VFL).

Notes

External links 
		
DemonWiki page

1960 births
Australian rules footballers from Victoria (Australia)
North Melbourne Football Club players
Melbourne Football Club players
Brunswick Football Club players
Living people